The Battle of Odelltown was fought on November 9, 1838, between Loyal volunteer forces under Lewis Odell and Charles McAllister and Patriote rebels under Robert Nelson, Médard Hébert and Charles Hindelang. The rebels were defeated in this battle, one of the last of the Lower Canada Rebellion of 1838.

Notes

References
"9 novembre 1838 - La Bataille d`Odelltown" at Les Patriote de 1837@1838
"Bataille d'Odelltown - 9 novembre 1838. (bataille)" in La Mémoire du Québec

Odelltown
Odelltown, Battle of
Odelltown
1838 in Lower Canada
November 1838 events
Events of National Historic Significance (Canada)